The 2013 Grand Prix cycliste de Gatineau was a one-day women's cycle  race held in Canada on 18 May 2013. The tour has an UCI rating of 1.1. The race was won by  the Shelley Olds  of Team TIBCO - To The Top.

References

Grand Prix cycliste de Gatineau
Grand Prix cycliste de Gatineau
Grand Prix cycliste de Gatineau
Cycle races in Canada